Arakoon is an eastern suburb of the town of South West Rocks in Kempsey Shire, New South Wales, Australia.

Arakoon was the original settlement of the town of  South West Rocks. The settlement was later moved to the present location, where better land conditions for building were available.

The area today is home to a small number of houses, a cafe, a caravan park and the Trial Bay Gaol.

Heritage listings
Arakoon has a number of heritage-listed sites, including:
 Cardwell Street: Trial Bay Gaol
 Lighthouse Road: Smoky Cape Lighthouse

References

External links 
 For photos of the area see the South West Rocks Photo Gallery

Towns in New South Wales
Coastal towns in New South Wales
Mid North Coast
Kempsey Shire